Eho Hamara Jeevna (Punjabi: ਏਹੁ ਹਮਾਰਾ ਜੀਵਣਾ; English Translation: This our life or And Such is Her Fate) is a Punjabi novel written by Dalip Kaur Tiwana. The novel was published in 1968 and it was the author's second novel. For this novel Tiwana received Sahitya Akademi Award in 1972.

Plot 
Bhano, a poor woman belonging to a poor farmer family in rural areas of Punjab, is the female protagonist of the novel. In her village women are often treated as commodity and sold for a little money. Bhano's father was ready to sell her daughter and arranges her marriage with Sarban, a resident of Moranwalli village. After her marriage she faces harassment and tortures. Sarban's four unmarried brothers try to abuse her sexually. The friends of Sarban also harass her. After the death of Sarban, Bhano's life becomes more miserable and her father tries to sell her once again to the brothers of Sarban. Bhano tries to escape by committing suicide. A man named Narain saves her and accepts her as his wife without denying to give any social recognition. Because of circumstances and patriarchal setup in her society Bhano fails to fulfil even her simplest goals in life.

Theme 
Tiwana attempted to portray an ordinary downtrodden Indian (Punjabi) woman's tragic life in this novel. Reviewer Harjeet Singh Gill analyzed Bhano's character as- "She has no kith or kin. Once the bargain is struck, her relationship with her parents also gets detached. She lives in an island of social outcast even in a small village. She belongs to none. But socially and individually, she does not 'exist, she only 'floats'.

Publication 
The novel was first published in 1968 and this was Dalip Kaur Tiwana's second novel. The novel was translated into English as And Such is Her Fate. Tiwana received Sahitya Akademi Award in 1972 for this novel.

Adaptation 
The novel was adapted into a film in 2011. Indian film personality Om Puri directed the serial. Puri told about making a film on the novel- "Eho Hamara Jeevna looks at the condition of women in Punjab and though the novel was written almost four decades ago, the story still rings true". It was also adapted into a television serial.

References 

1968 novels
Punjabi-language books
Novels about Indian women
1968 Indian novels